Abdellatif Miraoui (born 13 January 1962) is the Moroccan Minister of Higher Education, Scientific Research and Innovation. He was appointed as minister on 7 October 2021.

Education 
Miraoui holds a  PhD in Engineering Sciences (1992) from the University of Franche-Comté.

References 

1962 births
Living people
21st-century Moroccan politicians
Government ministers of Morocco
University of Franche-Comté alumni